Bar is a surname and a unisex given name. It may refer to:

Given name 
 Bar Tzuf Botzer (born 1994), Israeli tennis player
 Bar Paly (born 1985), Israeli-American model and actress
 Bar Refaeli (born 1985), Israeli model
 Bar Soloveychik (born 2000), Israeli swimmer
 Bar Timor (born 1992), Israeli basketball player

Surname 
 Alon Bar (born 1966), Israeli/American filmmaker
 Amos Bar (1931–2011), Israeli author, teacher, and editor
 Ellen Bar, New York City Ballet soloist
 Haim Bar (born 1954), Israeli footballer
 Israel Beer (1912–1966), sometimes spelled Yisrael Bar, convicted of espionage by Israel in 1961
 Jacques Bar (1912–2009), French film producer
 Moshe Bar (investor) (born 1971), Israeli technologist and author
 Moshe Bar (neuroscientist), Israeli neuroscientist
 Noma Bar (born 1973), graphic designer
 Sergiu Bar (born 1980), Romanian footballer
 Shirley Temple Bar, Irish drag queen
 Shlomo Bar (born 1943), Israeli musician and social activist
 Walter Bar (born 1938), Swiss fencer
 Zvi Bar (born 1935), Israeli politician

Unisex given names